The Freedom and Justice Party  is a progressive political party in Bolivia. 

At the legislative elections in 2002, the party won 2.7% of the popular vote and no seats in Congress. Its candidate at the presidential elections, Alberto Costa Obregón, won 2.7% of the popular vote.

Political parties in Bolivia
Political parties with year of establishment missing
Progressive parties in Bolivia